Filhaal or Filhall means "Momentary".

Filhaal may also refer to:

 Filhaal..., a 2002 Indian drama film 
 Filhall, a 2019 Indian Punjabi/Hindi song by Jaani and B Praak
 Filhaal2 Mohabbat, a 2021 Indian Punjabi/Hindi song by Jaani and B Praak